The eMate 300 was a personal digital assistant designed, manufactured and sold by Apple Computer to the education market as a low-cost laptop running the Newton operating system. It was the only Newton Device with a built-in keyboard. The eMate was introduced on March 7, 1997 for US$799 and was discontinued along with the Apple Newton product line and its operating system on February 27, 1998.

Features
The eMate 300 featured a 6.8" 480x320 resolution 16-shade grayscale display with a backlight, stylus pen, keyboard, infrared port, and standard Macintosh serial/LocalTalk ports.

The keyboard was roughly 85% the size of a standard "full size" keyboard.

Power came from built-in rechargeable batteries, which lasted up to 28 hours on full charge. In order to achieve its low price, the eMate 300 did not have all the features of the contemporary Newton equivalent, the MessagePad 2000. The eMate used a 25 MHz ARM 710a RISC processor and had less memory than the MessagePad 2000 which used a StrongARM 110 RISC processor and was more expandable. However the eMate 300 was faster than the previous MessagePad 130.

Expansion
Unlike the MessagePad line, the eMate 300 featured an internal memory expansion slot. It was located in the hatch under the battery door, next to the ROM card. Both cards fit into both slots, but the ROM card was larger. The expansion card is on the left. Companies like Newertech produced cards for the eMate. Most cards expanded the data bus from 16 bits to 32 bits, as well as providing additional DRAM (program memory), and flash (storage). When one of these cards was installed, the internal DRAM was disabled, but the internal flash RAM is combined with the flash on the card. For example: If a memory card were to have 4 MB of DRAM and 2 MB of flash, the Newton would report having 4 MB of flash, and 4 MB of DRAM, not 5 MB of DRAM.

In addition to the expansion slot, the eMate also featured a single non-CardBus PCMCIA slot. It could be used for a number of different cards, including modems, ethernet cards, wireless cards, bluetooth cards, and flash memory (linear and ATA/Compact Flash).

Design
The eMate 300 featured a green-colored translucent durable case designed for intense use in classrooms. The eMate 300 featured a dark green-colored keyboard similar to that of PowerBooks of the same era. Purple, clear, red, and orange colored eMate prototypes were produced for show only and were never put into mass production.

Timeline

See also
AlphaSmart Dana
iPad

Notes

References

External links
Everymac.com – eMate 300 Specifications
The Apple Museum – Newton eMate 300
Applefritter – eMate 300
IGM – eMate 300 review
Compare the eMate and iBook
Overclocking
"Apple Gets An 'A'" at BusinessWeek
Salon.com's review
STREETtech.com's review
Retrospective review at the-gadgeteer.com
Newtontalk: The Apple Newton mailing list
Byte Cellar: Newton eMate 300 As A Serial Terminal

Apple Newton
Apple Inc. personal digital assistants

it:EMate 300